Shields is an unincorporated community in Hamilton Township, Jackson County, Indiana.

History
Shields was laid out in 1866 by L. L. and William H. Shields, and named for them. A post office was established at Shields in 1866, and remained in operation until it was discontinued in 1904.

Geography

References

Unincorporated communities in Jackson County, Indiana
Unincorporated communities in Indiana